Mayank Austen Soofi is a Delhi-based Indian writer, blogger and photojournalist, who writes popular columns for Hindustan Times and Mint on culture, food and literary landscapes of Delhi.

He is best known for his website and blog, Delhiwale, a multifaceted guide of the city, that has been praised as being "the most compelling guide to India's capital" (The Independent) and "a one-man encyclopedia of the city" (Time Out Delhi).

Biography
Soofi was born in Nainital in the mountains of Uttarakhand and moved to Delhi around 2004. He uses 'Austen' as his middle name as a tribute to the author Jane Austen, about whom he often blogs. His writings were featured in Volume 4 of "Penguin Book of New Writing from India" published by Penguin.

In 2011, he published four alternative guidebooks to the city of Delhi: The Delhi Walla - Portraits, Delhi Food, Delhi Hangouts and Delhi Monuments.
His latest book Nobody Can Love You More, published in 2012 by Penguin Books, deals with the life of a 'kotha', Hindi for brothel, in Delhi's largest red-light district, G. B. Road, which is home to 5,000 sex workers.

Also well known for his popular columns on Delhi in the city supplement of Hindustan Times titled "The Delhiwalla", Soofi now writes a column, "Delhi's Belly", for the weekend supplement of the business newspaper Mint.

He has initiated many projects, including Mission Delhi, which aims to profile 1% of Delhi's 14 million people, and a blog dedicated to Arundhati Roy's debut novel, The God of Small Things, and to its readers. He recently started a reading club called The Delhi Proustians, which centers around the French novelist Marcel Proust and his seven volume novel, In Search of Lost Time.

Works
The Delhi Walla: Delhi Monuments – HarperCollins, 2011.
The Delhi Walla: Delhi Hangouts – HarperCollins, 2011.
The Delhi Walla: Delhi Food+Drink – HarperCollins, 2011.
The Delhi Walla: Portraits – HarperCollins, 2011.
Nobody Can Love You More –  Penguin Books, 2012.

References

External links
The Delhi Walla, website
 

Living people
Indian bloggers
Indian male journalists
Indian photojournalists
People from Nainital
Journalists from Delhi
Indian columnists
Indian food writers
Male bloggers
Year of birth missing (living people)